Pinchot University was a private graduate university in Seattle, Washington. Founded in 2002, Pinchot University was the first school to offer an MBA in Sustainable Business. In August 2016, Pinchot University was acquired by Presidio Graduate School.

History 
Pinchot University was founded in 2002 by Gifford Pinchot III, Libba Pinchot, Sherman Severin and Jill Bamburg as Bainbridge Graduate Institute (BGI). In November 2002, BGI was authorized by the State of Washington's Higher Education Coordinating Board to offer the MBA in Sustainable Business. In August 2009, BGI was awarded a grant of accreditation from the Accrediting Council for Independent Colleges and Schools (ACICS). In August 2016, Pinchot University was acquired by Presidio Graduate School.

References 

 
Educational institutions established in 2002
Colleges accredited by the Accrediting Council for Independent Colleges and Schools
Private universities and colleges in Washington (state)
Education in Kitsap County, Washington
Universities and colleges in Seattle
2002 establishments in Washington (state)